Out of the approximately 11,154 known bird species, 159 (1.4%) have become extinct, 226 (2%) are critically endangered, 461 (4.1%) are endangered, 800 (7.2%) are vulnerable and 1,018 (9.1%) are near threatened. There is a general consensus among scientists who study these trends that if human impact on the environment continues as it has, one-third of all bird species and an even greater proportion of bird populations will be gone by the end of this century.

Since 1500, 150 species of birds have become extinct. Historically, the majority of bird extinctions have occurred on islands, particularly those in the Pacific. These include countries such as New Zealand, Australia, Fiji, and Papua New Guinea.

Some species are not extinct and seem numerous, but exist in highly reduced numbers from previous years. For example, the Wood Thrush population in North America has declined 50% in the last 50 years. According to the American Bird Conservatory, in the Western Hemisphere 12% of bird species are declining at a rate such that they will be extinct within the next century.

Causes of bird extinction 
Human activity is the greatest cause of bird extinction around the world.  The top human causes of bird extinction involve: the increased human population, Climate change, destruction of habitat (through development for habitation, logging, animal and single-crop agriculture, and invasive plants), bird trafficking, egg collecting, pollution (in fertilizers impacting native plants and diversity, pesticides, herbicides directly impacting them as well as the plant and animal food birds eat, including the food for their food source further down along the food chain), and climate change and global warming. Due to the increasing human population, people seek additional space from what was once wild. This is a major contributor to extinction.

Natural 
As climate change is caused by a variety of activities, the effect that climate change has on bird extinction is immense. Due to the rapid changes in temperature and climate the bio diverse earth can not progress with these factors. Severe weather conditions and long seasons, as well as a chemical atmosphere within their surroundings, makes it difficult for many species of birds to keep up with. In Hawai'i, climate change is responsible for the decline in the population in Hawaiian forest birds and is resulting in an increase of avian malaria (plasmodium relictum). Because the dynamics of malaria are influenced by ambient temperature and participation patterns, the predicted climate changes are expected to increase the occurrence of avian malaria.

Sea level rise may flood islands killing the birds and other animals native to islands causing extinction.

Disease 
Each species of birds carries defense mechanisms like resistances and the ability to fight disease. With the changing climate and atmosphere, many species are losing their ability to fight particular diseases. These bird species are becoming more susceptible to disease, which results to the downfall of extinction. The most common disease affecting birds is Salmonellosis, which originates from the Latin name of salmonella. Infected birds pass bacteria in their fecal droppings, and other birds then become ill when they eat food contaminated by the droppings. Bird mites consist of some species of mites and lice that reside within bird feathers and skin, although some feed on blood. Bird mites can cause anemia and death among young birds. If bird mites infect a nest, it will cause the parents to abandon their offspring.

Notable examples

Dodo 
Perhaps one of the most widely recognized extinct bird species is the dodo. It was a plump, flightless bird that lived solely on the island of Mauritius in the Indian Ocean. With abundant food and no predators on the island, their descendants evolved & grew heavier and bigger, their beaks grew larger, and their wings smaller. Its limited range, inability to fly, and lack of exposure to and fear of humans contributed to its rapid extinction. Humans in the 17th century took advantage of its fearlessness and flightlessness by killing them in their hundreds as a food source for sailors. The dodo likely became extinct before it was fully described by taxonomists. Its sudden extinction highlights the susceptibility of endemic island species, and the dodo serves as an early poster species for anthropogenic extinction.

Great auk 
The great auk (or, as it has been nicknamed, “The Dodo of the North” or “Penguin of the North”) was a flightless marine bird that inhabited the cold North Atlantic ocean and islands. Its range once extended to the continental United States and Europe. However, by the 1800’s had a very limited range, breeding only on a few rocky islands in the North Atlantic. It was targeted by hunters for its prized skin. Hunters took advantage of the great auk's breeding season, when pairs nested in large colonies on rocky islands. It was much more difficult to hunt when not breeding, as birds were less concentrated and spent most of their time in frigid waters, where they were fast swimmers. The last accepted sighting of the species alive was in 1844, when a breeding pair was found and strangled by hunters hoping to sell the sought-after skins.

Passenger pigeon 
A more contemporary bird extinction was that of North America's passenger pigeon. It was a flocking species that once occurred in great densities. Prior to the arrival of colonial Europeans in North America, the passenger pigeon was thought to account for up to 40% of all individual birds on the continent. It was declared extinct in 1914, with the death of the last known survivor of the species, Martha, at the Cincinnati Zoo. However, it had not been seen in the wild for nearly 20 years prior to Martha's death. The main drivers of the species extinction were habitat destruction and hunting. The habitat destruction was also related to the invasive chestnut blight, which greatly reduced the number of American chestnut trees in North America. The passenger pigeon is one of the few recently extinct bird species that has been proposed for “de-extinction”. The entire genome of the species has been sequenced from surviving tissue with the hope of being able to bring it back onto the landscape using novel genetic techniques. However, birds are more complicated physiologically than mammals, which presents practical difficulties to the process of de-extinction.

By region

Australia
In June 2020 the Royal Society of South Australia published a list of 95 Australian bird fossils. The list includes three species of huge flamingos from the Kati Thanda-Lake Eyre and Lake Frome areas of South Australia, which were estimated to inhabit the area for 25 million years before becoming extinct about 140,000 years ago, most likely from drought. Researcher Trevor Worthy said that little was known about the evolution of birds in Australia, which stands at about 1,000 species.

See also
 List of recently extinct bird species
 List of bird extinctions by year

References

Extinction events
Extinct birds
Human impact on the environment